Alia Al Mansoori (born July 23, 2002) is an Emirati teenage pupil at Al Mawakeb School. In 2017 she won the Genes in Space UAE competition, with a proposal to study how exposure to space affects the health of live organisms at cellular level. Her experiment was loaded onto the August 2017 SpaceX CRS-12 mission. Al Mansoori's experiment studied the expression of heat-shock proteins in space, establishing that the genes turning them on could be detected.

Al Mansoori plans to study genetics at university, ultimately pursuing postgraduate study to become an astronaut. Her dream "is to be the first Emirati woman to visit Mars".

References

2002 births
Living people
Space scientists
Women space scientists
Emirati women scientists